Jacek Ziober (born 18 November 1965 in Łódź) is a Polish former football player. In years 1989-1993 he was a key player of Poland national football team. In 1990 won the Polish player of the year contest. With Montpellier HSC he competed in the 1991 Cup Winners' Cup, losing in the quarterfinals to Manchester United. In 1993 he was traded to CA Osasuna but after one season the team was relegated to the Segunda División; in 1996 Ziober returned to Poland to play for Amica Wronki. Since Polish national team failed to qualify to any major tournament in the 1990s, Ziober never played neither in the World Cup nor in European Championship. His greatest international success remains the bronze medal (4th place) in the U-18 World Cup in 1984, where he played alongside future national team teammate, Roman Kosecki.

Style of play 

Ziober was a pacy winger who possessed good dribbling ability, thus he could easily get the better of most defenders. He was, however, sometimes criticized for too egoistic play. Ziober was recognizable by his shoulder-long hairstyle, which he sported for most of his career.

Coaching 

Currently, Ziober is the coach and manager of Poland national beach soccer team

References
 
 International appearances

1965 births
Living people
Polish footballers
Polish expatriate footballers
Polish expatriate sportspeople in Spain
Poland international footballers
ŁKS Łódź players
Montpellier HSC players
Ligue 1 players
Expatriate footballers in France
CA Osasuna players
La Liga players
Expatriate footballers in Spain
Amica Wronki players
Tampa Bay Mutiny players
Major League Soccer players
Expatriate soccer players in the United States
Footballers from Łódź
Association football forwards